After the Centre Democrats left the government coalition in 1996, the sitting Danish Prime Minister Poul Nyrup Rasmussen was able to form a government coalition of his own Social Democrats and the Danish Social Liberal Party. The resulting cabinet, which replaced the Cabinet of Poul Nyrup Rasmussen II, was formed on 30 December 1996 and was called the Cabinet of Poul Nyrup Rasmussen III.

The cabinet was replaced by the Cabinet of Poul Nyrup Rasmussen IV on 23 March 1998 after the 1998 Danish parliamentary election.

Cabinet changes 
The cabinet was changed on 20 October 1997.

Some periods in the table below start before 30 December 1996 or end after 23 March 1998 because the minister was in the Cabinet of Poul Nyrup Rasmussen II or the Cabinet of Poul Nyrup Rasmussen IV as well.

References 
 Regeringen Poul Nyrup Rasmussen III – from the official website of the Folketing

1996 establishments in Denmark
1998 disestablishments in Denmark
Rasmussen, Poul Nyrup 3
Cabinets established in 1996
Cabinets disestablished in 1998